During the 2000–01 English football season, Norwich City F.C. competed in the Football League First Division.

Season summary
Rioch's successor, Bryan Hamilton, lasted in the job for six months before he resigned with the club 20th in the First Division, and in real danger of relegation to the third tier of English football for the first time since the 1960s. The new appointee was Nigel Worthington, who had been Hamilton's assistant manager and he successfully steered the team away from the threat of relegation to finish mid-table.

Final league table

Results
Norwich City's score comes first

Legend

Football League First Division

FA Cup

League Cup

Players

First-team squad
Squad at end of season

Left club during season

Notes

References

Norwich City F.C. seasons
Norwich City